Reborn is Avalon's thirteenth release and their ninth studio album.  It is the first album featuring Amy Richardson as a member of Avalon and the first full album to feature Jeremi Richardson.  It also marks the first album with E1 Music as Avalon's new record label.  Released on September 15, 2009, Reborn contains the radio singles "Arise" and "Alive"; "Arise" peaked at the No. 1 position on Billboards Soft AC/Inspirational National Airplay radio chart in late 2009, garnering Avalon their 22nd career No. 1 hit.

Track listing

 Personnel Avalon Janna Long – vocals
 Jeremi Richardson – vocals
 Amy McBride Richardson – vocals
 Greg Long – vocalsMusicians'
 Brian Duncan – keyboards, acoustic piano, programming 
 Mike Payne – guitars 
 Tony Lucido – bass 
 Ricky Free – drums 
 Ben Phillips – drums

Production 
 Norman Miller – executive producer 
 Ian Eskelin – producer 
 Barry Weeks – additional vocal production, mixing 
 Dan Shike – mastering 
 Ben McCraw – design, layout 
 Josh Hailey – photography

References

2009 albums
Avalon (band) albums